Elisha Buster "Jake" Bell (March 15, 1918 – March 3, 1997) was an American Negro league third baseman in the 1940s.

A native of Warren County, Georgia, Bell played with the Philadelphia Stars in 1946. In ten recorded games, he posted six hits in 32 plate appearances. Bell died in Philadelphia, Pennsylvania in 1997 at age 78.

References

External links
 and Baseball-Reference Black Baseball stats and Seamheads 

Philadelphia Stars players
1918 births
1997 deaths
Baseball third basemen